Greg Morrison (born 19 February 1998) is a Scottish professional footballer who plays as a forward for Rothes.

Career
Morrison came through the youth ranks at Ross County, scoring a number of goals and consistently was a standout performer alongside his half brother Owen Cairns. He made his first-team debut for County against Aberdeen in January 2016. On 30 August 2017, he joined Scottish Championship side Dumbarton on loan until January 2018. He scored his first goal for the club on his 11th appearance, in a 2–2 draw with Queen of the South in November 2017. After making 15 appearances for the Sons, scoring once, Morrison returned to the Staggies at the end of his loan spell. In August 2018, Morrison was loaned to Elgin City.

Career statistics

References

External links

1998 births
Living people
Scottish footballers
Association football forwards
Ross County F.C. players
Dumbarton F.C. players
Scottish Professional Football League players
People from Elgin, Moray
Elgin City F.C. players
Sportspeople from Moray